Achraf Lazaar (born 22 January 1992) is a Moroccan international footballer who plays as a left midfielder or left back for Italian  club Novara.

Club career 
Born in Casablanca, Lazaar moved to Italy with his parents in 2003. He began his football career with Varese's youth system, at the age of fifteen. He went on to make his senior debut with the team in Serie B, in 2012, immediately emerging as one of the most interesting prospects from the small Lombardian team.

In January 2014, he was signed by top of Serie B Palermo, on loan with the option to make the move permanent by the end of the season. Initially signed as an understudy to the more experienced Fabio Daprelà, Lazaar immediately gained a starting spot thanks to his impressive performances. He was later permanently signed by Palermo and confirmed as part of the club's 2014–15 squad.

On 28 August 2016, Lazaar joined Newcastle United on a five-year deal. He made his debut in a 2–0 win in the EFL Cup against Wolverhampton Wanderers on 20 September 2016. His league debut took place when he came on as a 72nd-minute substitute for Yoan Gouffran against Brentford on 15 October 2016. On 31 August 2017 Lazaar returned to Italy with a loan to Benevento. On 31 January 2019 Lazaar joined Sheffield Wednesday on loan until the end of the season.

On 2 September 2019, he joined Italian Serie B club Cosenza on loan.

On 4 February 2021, Lazaar and Newcastle United mutually agreed to terminate his contract.

On 11 February 2021, Lazaar signed for Watford on a deal until the end of the season, with an option to extend a further year. He left Watford at the end of the 2020–21 season following the expiration of his contract. Following his release from Watford, Lazaar went on trial with Reading in July 2021.

On 26 August 2021, he joined Portimonense in Portugal on a two-year contract.

On 2 February 2023, he signed for Serie C club Novara until the end of the 2022–23 season.

International career 
Having been born in Morocco, Lazaar is eligible to play for Morocco by birth, but until 2015 was ineligible to play for Italy despite having been raised there. He holds Italian citizenship since April 2015. He had originally never stated a clear preference to represent  Morocco or Italy, instead declaring he would play for the first international team that showed a genuine interest in calling him up. His impressive Serie B performances with Palermo brought interest from the Moroccan national team, who called him up for a friendly match against Mozambique on 23 May 2014 and ended in a 4–0 win, during which he made his first senior international appearance.

Career statistics

References

External links 

Profile on Newcastle United website

 

1992 births
Living people
Moroccan footballers
Footballers from Casablanca
Italian sportspeople of African descent
Moroccan emigrants to Italy
Naturalised citizens of Italy
Morocco international footballers
Association football fullbacks
S.S.D. Varese Calcio players
Palermo F.C. players
Newcastle United F.C. players
Benevento Calcio players
Sheffield Wednesday F.C. players
Cosenza Calcio players
Watford F.C. players
Portimonense S.C. players
Serie A players
Serie B players
Serie C players
Novara F.C. players
English Football League players
Primeira Liga players
Moroccan expatriate footballers
Expatriate footballers in Italy
Moroccan expatriate sportspeople in Italy
Expatriate footballers in England
Moroccan expatriate sportspeople in England
Expatriate footballers in Portugal
Moroccan expatriate sportspeople in Portugal
Italian people of Moroccan descent